Reeling may refer to

 Silk reeling
 "The Reeling", a song by American electronic band Passion Pit
 Reeling (book), a film review book by Pauline Kael
 Reeling with PJ Harvey, a video album
 Reeling (album), a 2022 album by British alternative rock band the Mysterines

See also
 Reelin', a song by \Matt Corby